The Little Napoleon is a 1923 German silent historical comedy film directed by Georg Jacoby and starring Egon von Hagen, Paul Heidemann and Harry Liedtke. It depicts the life and amorous adventures of Jérôme Bonaparte, the younger brother of Napoleon, who installed him as King of Westphalia.

The film is best known for the small role played by Marlene Dietrich as Kathrin, a lady's maid. Her brief appearance was filmed over several days during the summer of 1922. It marked Dietrich's film debut, though she was later unhappy with her early silent films. She was cast after impressing the director, Georg Jacoby, during a meeting arranged for them. Dietrich played gradually more substantial roles during the rest of the decade until her breakthrough film The Blue Angel (1930).

The film was made by the European Film Alliance (EFA), a failed attempt by the American firm Paramount to establish a production base in the lucrative German market. The EFA was wound up shortly after the film's completion, which delayed its release. It finally premièred on 29 November 1923 at the Marmorhaus in Berlin.

The Little Napoleon is one of many works from 1923 that entered the public domain in the United States in 2019.

Cast

References

Bibliography

External links

1923 films
1920s historical comedy films
German black-and-white films
German historical comedy films
Films of the Weimar Republic
German silent feature films
Films directed by Georg Jacoby
Films set in the 1800s
Films set in the 1810s
Comedy films based on actual events
Films shot in Germany
Depictions of Napoleon on film
Silent historical comedy films
1920s German films
1920s German-language films